Two ships of the United States Navy have been named Barton in honor of Rear Admiral John Kennedy Barton.

 , was a Benson-class destroyer launched in 1942 that was sunk by enemy action on 13 November 1942.
 , was a Allen M. Sumner-class destroyer launched in 1943 that served until 1968.

United States Navy ship names